Saint George Sports Club is an Ethiopian professional association football club based in Addis Abeba, who currently play in the Ethiopian Premier League. They have played at their current home ground, Addis Abeba Stadium, since its opening in 1940.

Saint George's first set of players were selected from students attending to local Addis Abeba school, Teferi Mekonen and Kidus Giorgis (Saint George).

Players 
The first players to play for Saint George include:

 / George Ducas
  Ayale Atnash 
  Tadesse Gete
  Metasebia Tessema
  Tesfaye Abegas
  Kassa Wolde 
  Kebede Gete
  Afework Gebremeskel
  Tesfaye Memeray
  Tadesse Tessema 
  Beyene Woldemariam
  Yidnekatchew Tessema (1935-1958)

List of other Saint George players:

References 

Lists of association football players by club
Association football player non-biographical articles